The Mill Mountain Zoo is a zoo located atop Mill Mountain in Roanoke, Virginia, United States. When it opened in 1952, the zoo was operated by the City of Roanoke. In 1976, the city turned its operation over to the Roanoke Jaycees. The Jaycees operated the zoo until 1988 when its operation was handed over to the non-profit Blue Ridge Zoological Society (BRZS). The BRZS still serves as the operator and fund raiser for the zoo.

History
With its location atop Mill Mountain not being conducive to a major expansion, a proposal was developed in 1984 to relocate the zoo to a  tract adjacent to the Blue Ridge Parkway to be called the Blue Ridge Zoo. This proposal was later abandoned in favor of the development of Virginia's Explore Park at that location. After the failed relocation proposal, the Blue Ridge Zoological Society voted in 1988 to keep the zoo permanently atop Mill Mountain. As part of this decision, a 10-year master plan, called Zoo 2001, was completed in 1991, with some of its suggestions implemented over the course of the next decade.

In June 2021, the zoo completed its largest capital project in three decades and added a black bear, heritage goats, hogs, turkeys and other animals.

Additions since 2008
New holding/quarantine building (houses new animals and the birds during the winter) – not accessible to the public
New animal clinic – not accessible to the public
Red Wolf Exhibit
Black Bear Exhibit
Interactive Aviary
Reptile House

Attractions and notable animals

The following are some of the more notable animals and attractions that have been at the zoo:
 Frump Frump was an African elephant donated to the zoo from a passing circus in 1970. Although she would die just a few months after being placed in the zoo, a record 107,000 visitors came, with many making the trip specifically to see her.
 Ruby was a Siberian tiger. She was donated to the zoo by law enforcement officers who found her being kept illegally as a pet in Danville, Virginia. Ruby was at the zoo from November 1988 until her death on December 10, 2006. Her habitat has since been converted to a wolf habitat.
 Oops is a Japanese macaque who escaped her cage in July 2006. Her escape was covered nationwide before she was recaptured a week later. She has since been moved to a larger facility to live with a larger group.
 Zoo Choo began operating when the zoo opened in 1952. It originally consisted of a gas-powered Model G-16 miniature train engine, two passenger cars and an observation car. The train operated continuously except between 1994 and 1996 and in 2002. In 2007, it was relocated to the Virginia Museum of Transportation. The zoo replaced it with another G-16 miniature train engine in August 2008.
Hyde is a female black bear.

The zoo is host to 85 animals among 35 species, including two species on the endangered list, the red panda and snow leopard. It is constantly undergoing changes with a variety of species being added including the opening of an interactive aviary in 2008 and a reptile house in 2009. Some of the favorite attractions are Bo, the very lovable wolverine; Nina, the cougar; Tasha (who died at a very old age recently) and Boris, the snow leopards; Nova, the red panda who was later joined by Takeo (Sophia, the zoo's red panda, was sent for breeding at Denver Zoo); and Richard, Mom, and Oops, the Japanese macaques. Recent additions are red wolves, cinereous vultures, four Asian small-clawed otters, and Pallas's cats.

Current animals:
Hoofstock Yard (dwarf zebu, pygmy goat, pot-bellied pigs)
American black bear
Tufted deer
Snow leopard
Red panda
Red wolves
Eurasian lynx
Opossum 
Oriental small-clawed otters
Red fox
Sulcata tortoise
Burmese pythons
Eastern screech owl
Golden pheasant
Sandhill crane
Red-billed blue magpie
Indian crested porcupine
Black-tufted marmosets
Fishing cat
Raccoon
Pallas's cats
Bald eagle
Various other birds and reptiles

Past animals:
Corsac foxes (3 of only 5 in the United States)
White-naped crane
Parma wallabies
African elephant
Siberian tiger
Canadian lynx
Red kangaroo
Red tailed hawk
American alligator
Sichuan takin
Wolverine
Japanese macaque
Great horned owl
Cavy
Cougar
Animals of the future
Bobcat
River otter

References

External links
 

Zoos in Virginia
1952 establishments in Virginia
Tourist attractions in Roanoke, Virginia
Zoos established in 1952